Keepin' Dah Funk Alive 4-1995 is a live double CD set by Bootsy's New Rubber Band. The album was first released by P-Vine Records on January 25 1995, and by Rykodisc in the U.S. and the UK later that same year. The album was recorded at Club Jungle Bass in Tokyo, Japan on June 24 and 25, 1994, and represents the first live recording of Bootsy and his Rubber Band. The album includes a fold-out poster.

Track listing

Disc One:

"Intro" (Bootsy Collins)  1:38
"Ahh...The Name Is Bootsy, Baby"  5:19
"Bootsy? (What's The Name Of This Town?)"  3:40
"Psychoticbumpschool"  2:42
"The Pinocchio Theory"  2:03
"Hollywood Squares"  4:11
"Bernie Solo" (Bernie Worrell)  3:07
"One Nation Under a Groove"  7:14  lyrics
"P. Funk (Wants To Get Funked Up)"  9:38
"Cosmic Slop"  3:59  lyrics
"Flash Light"  4:46
"Bootzilla"  1:16
"Roto-Rooter"  3:10

Disc Two:

"I'd Rather Be With You"  10:45
"A Sacred Place (R.I.P.)"  7:43
"Medley: Stretchin' Out/Touch Somebody" (Bootsy Collins)  11:20
"Night of the Thumpasorus Peoples"  2:22
"Keepin' Dah Funk Alive 4-1995" (Bootsy Collins)  4:10

Personnel

Producer: At'c Inoue (P-Vine Records)
Vocals: Bootsy Collins, Mudbone Cooper, Henry Benifield, Michael Gatheright
Drums: Frankie "Kash" Waddy
Lead Guitar: Gary "Dirty Mugg" James
Rhythm Guitar: Flip Cornett & Bootsy Collins
Bass: Flip Cornett
Space Bass: "Ill-Legal Alien" Bootsy Collins
Space Keyboards: "Ill-Legal Alien" Bernie Worrell
Finger Funkin' Keys: Joel "Razor Sharp" or Straight Razor Johnson
Religiously Funky Keys: Greg "Daffy Ducking" Fitz
3 Day Rehearsal Horn Section: Vince & Reggie Calloway, Larry Hatcher, Don Bynum, Rick Gardner

Bootsy Collins albums
1995 live albums
Rykodisc live albums